Montgomery Square is a major intersection in the east of Brussels.

Montgomery Square may also refer to:

 Montgomery Square, Pennsylvania, US
 Montgomery Square, in the centre of Wath-upon-Dearne, England
 Montgomery Square, Canary Wharf, London, site of a sculpture by Eilis O'Connell

See also
 Montgomery modular multiplication